The Breeders Crown is an annual series of Harness races in the United States and Canada covering each of the sport's twelve traditional categories of age, gait and gender.  The series was initiated by the Hambletonian Society, promoters of the Hambletonian Stakes, in 1984 to enhance the Standardbred breeding industry and to promote the sport of Harness racing by providing a lucrative high-profile championship race in each of these categories.  The annual races for 3-year-old trotting colts and geldings and 3-year-old pacing colts and geldings, are each part of the Grand Slam Prize in harness racing.

For its first 15 years, races were contested at tracks around North America.  After a 1998 appearance at the then-new Colonial Downs near Richmond, Virginia, the series has rotated between The Meadowlands (near New York City), Mohegan Sun at Pocono Downs (in Wilkes-Barre, Pennsylvania), and the Greater Toronto Area's two tracks, Woodbine Racetrack and Mohawk Racetrack.  In 2017, the series will be contested at Hoosier Park Racing & Casino.

List of Races
 Breeders Crown 2YO Filly Pace
 Breeders Crown 2YO Filly Trot
 Breeders Crown 2YO Colt & Gelding Pace
 Breeders Crown 2YO Colt & Gelding Trot
 Breeders Crown 3YO Filly Pace
 Run for the Max C. Hempt Memorial Trophy
 Breeders Crown 3YO Filly Trot
 Run for the John Simpson Sr. Memorial Trophy
 Breeders Crown 3YO Colt & Gelding Pace (1984-)
 Run for the H.A. Grant Memorial Trophy
 Breeders Crown 3YO Colt & Gelding Trot (1984-)
 Run for the John Cashman Jr. Memorial Trophy
 Breeders Crown Open Mare Pace (1986-)
 Breeders Crown Open Mare Trot (1986-1995, 2004-)
 Open Pace (1985-)
 Open Trot (1985-)

Breeders Crown Sites

See also
 List of Breeders Crown Winners
 Breeders' Cup

References

External links
 Official Site (in beta)

 
Harness races in the United States